Scaphidium is a genus of shining fungus beetles belonging to the family Staphylinidae, subfamily Scaphidiinae.

Species
These 62 species belong to the genus Scaphidium:

 Scaphidium ahrensi Tu & Tang g
 Scaphidium amurense Solsky, 1871
 Scaphidium bayibin i Tang et al., 2014
 Scaphidium becvari Löbl, 1999
 Scaphidium biwenxuani He, Tang & Li, 2008 g
 Scaphidium castanicolor Csiki, 1924 g
 Scaphidium comes Loebl, 1968 g
 Scaphidium connexum Tang et al., 2014
 Scaphidium crypticum Tang et al., 2014
 Scaphidium delatouchei Achard, 1920 g
 Scaphidium deletum Heer, 1847 †
 Scaphidium direptum Tang & Li, 2010 g
 Scaphidium egregium Achard, 1922
 Scaphidium fainanense Pic, 1915 g
 Scaphidium flavofasciatum Miwa & Mitono, 1943
 Scaphidium flavomaculatum Miwa & Nitono, 1943 g
 Scaphidium formosanum Pic, 1915 g
 Scaphidium fukiense Pic, 1954 g
 Scaphidium grande Gestro, 1880 g
 Scaphidium inexspectatum Löbl, 1999
 Scaphidium inflexitibiale Tang & Li, 2010
 Scaphidium jinmingi Tang et al., 2014
 Scaphidium jizuense Löbl, 1999
 Scaphidium klapperichi Pic, 1954 g
 Scaphidium kubani Löbl, 1999
 Scaphidium kurbatovi Löbl, 1999
 Scaphidium laxum Tang & Li, 2010
 Scaphidium liui Tang & Li, 2010
 Scaphidium longipenne Achard, 1921 g
 Scaphidium longum Tang & Li, 2010
 Scaphidium lunare Löbl, 1999
 Scaphidium lunatum Motschulsky, 1859
 Scaphidium montivagum Shirozu & Morimoto, 1963
 Scaphidium nigrocinctulum Oberthur, 1884 g
 Scaphidium obliteratum LeConte, 1860 g
 Scaphidium ornatum Casey
 Scaphidium piceum Melsheimer, 1844 g b
 Scaphidium pusillum Gyllenhal, 1808 g
 Scaphidium quadriguttatum Melsheimer i c g b
 Scaphidium quadrimaculatum Olivier, 1790 g
 Scaphidium quinquemaculatum Pic, 1915 g
 Scaphidium reni Tang & Li, 2010
 Scaphidium robustum Tang et al., 2014
 Scaphidium sauteri Miwa & Nitono, 1943 g
 Scaphidium schuelkei Löbl, 1999
 Scaphidium shibatai Kimura, 1987 g
 Scaphidium shrakii Miwa & Nitono, 1943 g
 Scaphidium sichuanum Löbl, 1999
 Scaphidium sinense Pic, 1954 g
 Scaphidium sinuatum Csiki, 1924 g
 Scaphidium solukhumbu g
 Scaphidium spinatum Tang & Li, 2010
 Scaphidium stigmatinotum Loebl, 1999 g
 Scaphidium takahashii Miwa & Nitono, 1943 g
 Scaphidium variegatum Pic, 1915 g
 Scaphidium varifasciatum Tang et al., 2014
 Scaphidium vernicatum Pic, 1954 g
 Scaphidium vicinum Pic, 1915 g
 Scaphidium wuyongxiangi He, Tang & Li, 2008 g
 Scaphidium yeti  g
 Scaphidium yunnanum Fairmaire, 1886
 Scaphidium yuzhizhoui Tang, Tu & Li g
Data sources: i = ITIS, c = Catalogue of Life, g = GBIF, b = Bugguide.net

References

External links

 
 

Staphylinidae